"Mi Niña Mujer" is a song by Mexican group Los Ángeles Azules from Los Ángeles Azules's 1996 studio album Cómo Te Voy a Olvidar. A remix version featuring American duo Ha*Ash was released on August 5, 2016. The track peaked at number 31 in the Mexico Airplay, number 11 in the Mexico Espanol Airplay charts in México.

Background and release 
"Mi Niña Mujer" was written by Jorge Mejía Avante, and produced by Camilo Lara. Is a song recorded by Mexican group Los Ángeles Azules from Los Ángeles Azules's 1996 studio album Cómo Te Voy a Olvidar. A Remix version with American duo Ha*Ash it was released as the third single from the album De Plaza en Plaza on August 5, 2016, by OCESA Seitrack.

Music video 
A music video for "Mi Niña Mujer" featuring Ha*Ash was released on August 6, 2016. It was directed by Diego Álvarez and produced by Miguel Tafich and Sabú Avilés. The video was filmed in Convento San Miguel Arcángel, Maní, Yucatán with the song "Perdón, Perdón". As of March 2020, the video has over 246 million views on YouTube.

Live performances 
Los Ángeles Azules and Ha*Ash performed "Mi Niña Mujer" for the first time at the "Los 40 Principales" in México in October 2016.

Charts

References 

Ha*Ash songs
2016 singles
2016 songs
Spanish-language songs